Drebrin-like protein is a protein that in humans is encoded by the DBNL gene.

Interactions 

Drebrin-like has been shown to interact with Cyclin-dependent kinase 4, MAP4K1 and ZAP-70.

References

Further reading